Theatre '62 is an American dramatic anthology series produced by Fred Coe. Seven hour-long episodes aired on the National Broadcasting Company during the 1961–62 season. Its episodes were abridged adaptations of popular feature films produced by David O. Selznick.

Production
Theatre '62 was announced as a series that would present eight hour-long adaptions of feature films produced by David O. Selznick. The TV plays were to be presented monthly beginning in October 1961, but the last of the announced episodes, Portrait of Jennie, was not produced.

Sumner Locke Elliott adapted "Notorious" and "Spellbound"  for the series; Robert Goldman adapted "The Spiral Staircase" and "The Paradine Case". Directors included Paul Bogart, Fielder Cook and Boris Sagal.

The presentation of "Rebecca" on April 8, 1962, was NBC's last live drama in prime time until 1980, when The Oldest Living Graduate was presented.

Episodes

References

External links

1960s American anthology television series
1961 American television series debuts
1962 American television series endings
NBC original programming
Black-and-white American television shows